Asiabad is a village in Samangan Province, in northern Afghanistan. It lies along the A76 highway, to the immediate south of Hazrat e Soltan.

See also
 Samangan Province

References

External links
Maplandia World Gazetteer

Populated places in Samangan Province